The Basnahira Cricket Dundee was a franchise cricket team that took part in Sri Lanka Premier League, representing Western Province. The Basnahira cricket team was based in Colombo.Indian Cricket Dundee Limited purchased the team for $4.33 million in 2012. They was owned for seven years, after which a new agreement may be negotiated.

History

Current squad
Coach: Duleep Mendis

Players with international caps are listed in bold.

References

External links
Team site on ESPN CricInfo

Sri Lanka Premier League teams
Sports clubs in Sri Lanka
Cricket clubs established in 2012
Sports clubs disestablished in 2012
2012 establishments in Sri Lanka
Cricket in Colombo
Sport in Colombo